Manuela Vilar de Valle Dupuy (born 25 March 1994) is a Uruguayan field hockey player.

Career

Club level
At club level, Manuela Vilar plays for Dutch club HC MOP.

In the eventually cancelled 2019–20 season, Vilar played for Oranje-Rood in the Hoofdklasse, the Netherlands' top national league. She also previously played for River Plate in Argentina.

National level

Under–21
Vilar made her debut for the Uruguayan U–21 team in 2012 at the Pan American Junior Championship in Guadalajara.

Senior team
As well as making her junior debut in 2012, Vilar also debuted for Las Cimarronas late that year during the inaugural season of the FIH World League.

She was a member of the team at the 2017 Pan American Cup in Lancaster.

In 2019, she appeared at the FIH Series Finals in Hiroshima, and the Pan American Games in Lima.

References

External links

1994 births
Living people
Female field hockey defenders
Uruguayan female field hockey players
South American Games bronze medalists for Uruguay
South American Games medalists in field hockey
Competitors at the 2014 South American Games
Competitors at the 2022 South American Games
21st-century Uruguayan women